Jonathan Dermot Spence  (11 August 1936 – 25 December 2021) was an English-born American historian, sinologist, and writer who specialized in Chinese history. He was Sterling Professor of History at Yale University from 1993 to 2008. His most widely read book is The Search for Modern China, a survey of the last several hundred years of Chinese history based on his popular course at Yale. A prolific author, reviewer, and essayist, he published more than a dozen books on China. Spence's major interest was modern China, especially the Qing dynasty, and relations between China and the West. Spence frequently used biographies to examine cultural and political history. Another common theme is the efforts of both Westerners and Chinese "to change China", and how such efforts were frustrated.

Early life 
Spence was born on 11 August 1936 to Muriel ( Crailsham) and Dermot Spence in Surrey in England. His mother was a French researcher while his father worked at an art gallery and a publishing house.

Spence was educated at Winchester College and at Clare College, Cambridge, graduating in 1954. He spent two years in the British Army after graduating and was deployed in Germany during this period. He received his BA in history from Cambridge in 1959, studying at Clare College, Cambridge. During this time he was the editor of the campus magazine and was also the co-editor of British literary magazine Granta. He went to Yale University on a Clare-Mellon Fellowship to study the history and culture of China, receiving an MA and then a PhD in 1965, when he won the John Addison Porter Prize. As part of his graduate training, he spent a year in Australia to study under Fang Chao-ying and Tu Lien-che, scholars of the Qing dynasty.

Career
Spence taught a popular undergraduate course at Yale University on the history of modern China, which formed the basis for his book The Search for Modern China (1990). He taught for more than 40 years at the university. During this time he wrote many books on China that furthered the understanding of the country and its culture with Western audiences. Some of his books during this period included The Search for Modern China (1990), which was published on the back of the Tiananmen Square massacre in 1989, and God's Chinese Son: The Taiping Heavenly Kingdom of Hong Xiuquan (1996).

Spence was president of the American Historical Association between 2004 and 2005. While his primary focus was on Qing dynasty China, he also wrote a biography of Mao Zedong and The Gate of Heavenly Peace, a study of twentieth-century intellectuals and their relation to revolution. He retired from Yale in 2008.

His book The Search for Modern China was a New York Times best seller and documented the evolution of China starting from the decline of the Ming dynasty in the early 1600s to the pro-democracy movement of 1989, while his book Treason by the Book (2001) documented the story of a scholar who took on the third Manchu Emperor in the 1700s.

Honors
Spence received eight honorary degrees in the United States as well as from the Chinese University of Hong Kong, and (in 2003) from Oxford University. He was invited to become a visiting professor at Peking University and an honorary professor at Nanjing University. He was named Companion of the Order of St Michael and St George in 2001, and in 2006, he was elected an Honorary Fellow of Clare College, Cambridge.

He received the William C. DeVane Medal of the Yale Chapter of Phi Beta Kappa (1952); a Guggenheim Fellowship (1979); the Los Angeles Times History Prize (1982), and the Vursel Prize of the American Academy and Institute of Arts and Letters (1983). He was elected to the American Academy of Arts and Sciences (1985), named a MacArthur Fellow (1988), appointed to the Council of Scholars of the Library of Congress (1988), elected a member of the American Philosophical Society (1993), and named a corresponding fellow of the British Academy (1997).

In May and June 2008, he gave the 60th anniversary Reith Lectures, which were broadcast on BBC Radio 4.

In 2010, Spence was appointed to deliver the annual Jefferson Lecture at the Library of Congress, the US federal government's highest honour for achievement in the humanities.

Personal life
Spence's name in Chinese,  (pinyin: Shǐ Jǐngqiān), was given to him by Fang Chao-ying to reflect his love of history and admiration for the Han dynasty historian Sima Qian. Spence became a U.S. citizen in 2000.

Spence's wife Annping Chin was a senior lecturer in history at Yale with a PhD in Chinese thought from Columbia. He had two sons from a previous marriage (1962–1993) to Helen Alexander, Colin and Ian Spence, two stepchildren, Yar Woo and Mei Chin, a grandchild as well as two step-grandchildren. Spence died from complications of Parkinson's disease on 25 December 2021, at the age of 85 at his residence in West Haven, Connecticut.

Bibliography

Books
The Search for Modern China (1990; 2nd edition, 1999; 3rd edition 2013)
Tsʻao Yin and the Kʻang-hsi Emperor: bondservant and master (1966)
 To Change China: Western Advisers in China, 1620–1960 (Boston, Little Brown, 1969).
Emperor of China: Self-Portrait of K'ang-Hsi (1974)
The Death of Woman Wang (1978). Story situated in 17th century Tancheng. 
The Memory Palace of Matteo Ricci (1984)
The Question of Hu (New York: Knopf, 1987 ). Biography of John Hu 胡若望, 18th-century Chinese who went to France with Jean-François Foucquet.
Chinese Roundabout: Essays on History and Culture
The Gate of Heavenly Peace: The Chinese and Their Revolution 1895–1980 (1982)
The Chan's Great Continent: China in Western Minds
God's Chinese Son (New York: Norton, 1996 ). Biography of Hong Xiuchuan, leader of Taiping Rebellion.

Treason by the Book (2001) 
Return to Dragon Mountain: Memories of a Late Ming Man (2007) Viking, 332 pages.

Book reviews
"The Dream of Catholic China" The New York Review of Books 54/11 (28 June 2007) : 22–24 [reviews Liam Matthew Brockey, Journey to the East: the Jesuit Mission to China, 1579–1724]

References

Citations

Sources 

 .
 
 Bruce Mazlish, "The Question of the Question of Hu", History and Theory 11 (1992): 141–152
 Mirsky, Jonathan. Review of Chinese Roundabout The New York Review of Books, Volume 39, Issue No. 17 (5 November 1992): 51–55.
 Nathan, Andrew J. "A Culture of Cruelty: Review of The Search for Modern China" pages 30–34 from The New Republic, Volume 203 (30 July 1990): 50–54.
 Roberts, Priscilla. "Spence, Jonathan D.", The Encyclopedia of Historians and Historical Writing edited by Kelly Boyd, Volume 2, (London: Fitzroy Dearborn Publishers, 1999. ): 1136–1137.

External links
Spence archive from The New York Review of Books
 

1936 births
2021 deaths
Alumni of Clare College, Cambridge
British historians
British sinologists
Companions of the Order of St Michael and St George
Corresponding Fellows of the British Academy
English emigrants to the United States
Historians of China
MacArthur Fellows
Microhistorians
People educated at Winchester College
People from Surrey (before 1965)
People with acquired American citizenship
Presidents of the American Historical Association
Yale Sterling Professors
Yale University faculty
Deaths from Parkinson's disease
Neurological disease deaths in Connecticut